Heart of Midlothian may refer to:

 Old Tolbooth, Edinburgh, a structure known as the "Heart of Midlothian"
 Heart of Midlothian (Royal Mile), a mosaic heart in the pavement of Edinburgh's Royal Mile at the former site of Old Tolbooth
 The Heart of Midlothian, an 1818 novel by Sir Walter Scott, the title referring to Old Tolbooth
 The Heart of Midlothian (film), a 1914 British silent film adaption of Scott's novel
 A Woman's Triumph, a 1914 American silent film adaption of Scott's novel
 Heart of Midlothian F.C., an Edinburgh association football club
 Heart of Midlothian F.C. Under-20s and Academy, an associated youth team and system
 Heart of Midlothian W.F.C., an associated women's football club

See also
 Heart of Lothian, a song by British neo-progressive rock band Marillion
 Midlothian (disambiguation)